Amy Cissé (born August 28, 1969 in Brignoles, France) is a French basketball player. Cissé has had 79 selections on the French national women's basketball team from 1989 to 1994.

References 
 sports reference federation francaise de basket-ball

French women's basketball players
Living people
1969 births
France women's national basketball team players